Celithemis is a genus of dragonflies in the family Libellulidae. They are known commonly as pennants. There are eight species in this monophyletic genus. They are mainly distributed in eastern North America.

Species
Species include:

Notes

References

External links
 Celithemis. Discover Life.

Libellulidae
Anisoptera genera
Taxa named by Hermann August Hagen